Chrysactinia acerosa is a Mexican species of flowering plant in the family Asteraceae. It is native to the states of Nuevo León and San Luis Potosí of northeastern Mexico.

Chrysactinia acerosa is a small evergreen subshrub rarely more than 20 cm (8 inches) tall. It is branched, with very narrow, needle-like leaves. Flower heads have yellow ray flowers and yellow disc flowers. Achenes are black. The species grows in dry locations in desert regions.

References

External links
Photo of herbarium specimen collected in Nuevo León

Flora of Northeastern Mexico
Tageteae
Plants described in 1916